Lehtsaare Nature Reserve is a nature reserve which is located in Viljandi County, Estonia.

The area of the nature reserve is 380 ha.

The protected area was founded in 1992 to protect the habitat for western capercaillie.

References

Nature reserves in Estonia
Geography of Viljandi County